Sage Brocklebank (born January 14, 1978) is a Canadian actor best known for his role as Buzz McNab, a long-standing role on the comedy-drama Psych. He also produces movies and writes for theatre and film.

Career

Actor
Since 2001 Brocklebank has appeared in over 40 film and television roles, including starring roles in How I Married My High School Crush, Psych!, A Bride for Christmas, Suspension, and Heavenly Match.  He has also appeared in Once Upon a Time (a one-time appearance as Gaston), Arrow, Smallville, Alien Trespass, Stargate SG-1, Supernatural, and Level Up.

Brocklebank has also long been involved in theater. He has created, produced, and starred in several plays in Vancouver, including:  Felony (Winner Site Specific award Vancouver Fringe Festival 2012), In a Dark Dark House, The Shape of Things, TAPE, and others.

Producer
Brocklebank started producing films in 2014 and has now produced Suspension (2015), Real Fiction (2016), and Ariel Unraveling (2016).

Personal life
Brocklebank is also a professional poker player. His parents (Brent and Judy Brocklebank) live in Vancouver, British Columbia.

Filmography

References

External links
SageBrocklebank.com - Official Website

1978 births
Living people
Canadian male television actors
Male actors from Vancouver